Loganlea State High School (LSHS) is a secondary school in Neridah Street at Loganlea, Logan City, Queensland, Australia, for students between years 7 and 12. The school was established in 1981 between the Logan River and the Beenleigh railway line.

It has an enrolment of 650 students and over 100 staff members.  The school is co-educational with students from a variety of cultural backgrounds.  Three year 8 scholarships are offered: an overall year, mathematics and science laptop, and one for dance.

Loganlea State High operates a working property which enables learning opportunities in animal husbandry and farming.  In recent years, students partaking in the agribusiness program have been able to spend time on a remote property in Central Queensland in order to gain practical skills as well as a sense of independence.

The school opened Knowledge House in 2006. Its purpose is to establish a more Indigenous-friendly curriculum. Knowledge House is a safe space, an Indigenous cultural experience, achieving results in urban areas for jarjums and community. 'Jarjums' is an Aboriginal word for students.
The school has facilities such as a dance studio, trade training center, kitchens, 4 science labs and a variety of different classrooms. The school also offers a wellbeing hub.

Students participate in group sporting activities as a member of one of Four houses; Pegasus (PEG), Hydra (HYD), Sagitta (SAG) and Ursa (URS). The School Swimming Carnival includes a teacher versus student relay, which is not seen at many other schools. The Dance Eisteddfod Team competes in the Brisbane performing challenge and the Ipswich Dance Eisteddfod.

Alumni Lists from 1982 can be found at Names Database.

Outdoor Education
Loganlea State High School has a commitment to utilising the outdoors as a core component of their teaching and learning approach. The school participates in programs, such as National Tree Day, which sees student planting thousands of native trees and plants across the campus each year. Additionally, many classes will have one lesson a week in the outdoors, this includes English lessons in the Yarning Circle, practical Geography lesson across the grounds, outdoor Science lessons and, Physical Education Classes.

The school boasts an impressive 56 hectares of land and host an Agribusiness Department, which has a farm set up with a range of animals and builds students skills in Animal Husbandry, Conservation and Land Management (Cert I & II), Agrifood Operations (Cert I) and Agriculture (Cert II).

In 2017, the school began offering a Certificate II in Outdoor Recreation, with specialisations in Canoeing, Bushwalking/Navigation and Fishing. The program is run on campus and offsite at locations which include Lamington National Park, Maroon Dam and Rainbow Beach.
One of the school's Mottos is "To the stars"

The school has 6 star programs including; Loganlea Institute of Sport (LIS), Hospitality, Loganlea Youth Development Program (LYDP), Dance, Signature and Agribusiness.

See also

List of schools in Greater Brisbane

References

External links
 

Public high schools in Queensland
Educational institutions established in 1981
Schools in Logan City
1981 establishments in Australia